French Leave is a 1930 British comedy film directed by Jack Raymond and starring Madeleine Carroll, Sydney Howard and Arthur Chesney. It was made at British and Dominions Elstree Studios. It is based on a play by Reginald Berkeley, a "light comedy in three acts", set during the First World War. It was remade in 1937 by Norman Lee.

Plot
During World War I, Captain's wife Dorothy Glenister finds it hard being separated from her husband, so she travels to France to the village where he's stationed. Dorothy disguises herself as the daughter of a local, which leads to complications when she's suspected of being a German spy.

Cast
Madeleine Carroll as Mlle. Juliette / Dorothy Glenister
Sydney Howard as Cpl. Sykes
Arthur Chesney as General Root
Haddon Mason as Captain Harry Glenister
Henry Kendall as Lt. George Graham
May Agate as Mme. Denaux
George Owen as Pvt. Jenks
George De Warfaz as Jules Marnier

Critical reception
The New York Times called it "a moderately amusing British picturization of the stage farce, "French Leave," with the charming Madeleine Carroll... the photography is sometimes none too clear, but the voices are nicely recorded"; while more recently, TV Guide thought it a "lame comedy...Long and tedious at 60 minutes; the original British cut ran 100 minutes."

References

Bibliography
Low, Rachael. Filmmaking in 1930s Britain. George Allen & Unwin, 1985.
Wood, Linda. British Films, 1927-1939. British Film Institute, 1986.

External links

1930 films
British World War II films
Films directed by Jack Raymond
1930 comedy films
British comedy films
British black-and-white films
Films set in the 1910s
Films shot at Imperial Studios, Elstree
British films based on plays
1930s English-language films
1930s British films